The 2014 season of the 3. divisjon, the fourth highest association football league for men in Norway.

Between 22 and 26 games (depending on group size) are played in 12 groups, with 3 points given for wins and 1 for draws. Twelve group winners are promoted to the 2. divisjon.

Tables 

Group 1
Sprint-Jeløy – promoted
Kråkerøy
Oppsal
Fredrikstad 2
Trosvik
Follo 2
Sarpsborg 08 2
Grorud 2
Nesodden
Selbak
Østsiden
Rustad – relegated
Sparta – relegated
Kolbotn – relegated

Group 2
Ullern – promoted
Frigg
Hauerseter
Strømmen 2
Hasle-Løren
Lyn 2
Korsvoll
Røa
Oslo City
Oldenborg
Ull/Kisa IL 2
Romsås – relegated
Lørenskog 2 – relegated
Kjelsås 2 – relegated

Group 3
Lillestrøm 2 – promoted
Funnefoss/Vormsund
Ottestad
Lillehammer
Flisa
Grue
Rælingen
Ham-Kam 2
Moelven
Gjøvik-Lyn 2
Raufoss 2
Gran – relegated
Sander – relegated
Storhamar – relegated

Group 4
Drammen FK – promoted
Jevnaker
Lommedalen
Odd 3
Modum
Åssiden
Bærum 2
Vestfossen
Lokomotiv Oslo
Mjøndalen 2
Skarphedin
Hønefoss 2 – relegated
Asker 2 – relegated:Kjapp – pulled team

Group 5
Donn – promoted
Tønsberg
Tollnes
Start 2
Randesund
Vigør
Pors 2 – relegated
Sandefjord 2
Mandalskameratene
Lyngdal
Larvik Turn
Urædd – relegated
Runar – relegated
Re – relegated

Group 6
Sola – promoted
Staal
Kopervik
Viking 2
Frøyland
Randaberg
Vardeneset
Bryne 2
Åkra
Vaulen
Sandnes Ulf 2
Klepp – relegated
Hundvåg – relegated
Austrått – relegated

Group 7
Odda – promoted
Sotra
Lysekloster
Bjarg
Haugesund 2
Os
Øystese
Vard 2
Vadmyra
Varegg
Lyngbø
Fyllingsdalen 2
Smørås – relegated
Frøya – relegated

Group 8
Aalesund 2 – promoted
Stryn
Sogndal 2
Tertnes
Hødd 2
Spjelkavik
Skarbøvik
Eid
Bergsøy
Årdal
Arna-Bjørnar
Tornado Måløy – relegated
Norborg – relegated
Larsnes/Gursken – relegated

Group 9
Strindheim – promoted
Brattvåg
Orkla
Sverresborg
Kolstad
KIL/Hemne
Heimdal
Buvik
Kristiansund 2
Charlottenlund
Nardo 2
Averøykameratene – relegated
Sunndal – relegated
Træff 2 – relegated

Group 10
Stjørdals-Blink – promoted
Tynset
Skedsmo
Steinkjer
Verdal
Gjerdrum
NTNUI
Ranheim 2
Alvdal
Åfjord
Byåsen 2
Fet – relegated
Rørvik – relegated
Fjellhamar – relegated

Group 11
Mjølner – promoted
Bodø/Glimt 2
Junkeren
Sandnessjøen
Mosjøen
Stålkameratene
Tverlandet
Sortland
Grand Bodø
Lofoten – relegated
Innstranden – relegated
Hardhaus – relegated

Group 12
Senja – promoted
Fløya
Kirkenes
Tromsø 2
Hammerfest
Bossekop
Skjervøy
Ishavsbyen
Porsanger
Skarp
Bjørnevatn
Sørøy/Glimt – relegated

References
NIFS

Norwegian Third Division seasons
4
Norway
Norway